Oscar Jonsson (born 21 April 1977) is a Swedish Bandy player who currently plays for Ljusdals BK as a half back or midfielder.  Oscar represented the Swedish national bandy team during the 2004/05 season.

Oscar has played for two clubs.
His list of clubs are as follows-
 Ljusdals BK (1995-2001)
 Hammarby IF Bandy (2001-2009)
 Ljusdals BK (2009-)

External links
  Oscar Jonsson at bandysidan
  hammarby if

1977 births
Living people
Swedish bandy players
Ljusdals BK players
Hammarby IF Bandy players
Edsbyns IF players